Mahshahr County is in Khuzestan province, Iran. The capital of the county is the city of Bandar-e Mahshahr. At the 2006 census, the county's population was 247,804 in 53,347 households. The following census in 2011 counted 278,037 people in 69,488 households. At the 2016 census, the county's population was 296,271 in 81,211 households.

Administrative divisions

The population history of Mahshahr County's administrative divisions over three consecutive censuses is shown in the following table. The latest census shows two districts, two rural districts, and three cities.

References

 

Counties of Khuzestan Province